
Listed below are executive orders signed by United States President Dwight D. Eisenhower. His executive orders and presidential proclamations are also listed on WikiSource.

Executive orders

1953

1954

1955

1956

1957

1958

1959

1960

1961

References

External links
 Executive Orders Disposition Tables National Archives, Federal Register

 
United States federal policy
Executive orders of Dwight D. Eisenhower